The Dead Room is a British supernatural drama television film broadcast on BBC Four on 24 December 2018 as a part of the BBC's Christmas festive programmes. The thirty-minute film, written and directed by Mark Gatiss, tells the tale of a long-running radio horror series of the same name and stars Simon Callow, Anjli Mohindra and Susan Penhaligon.

Cast and characters
Simon Callow as Aubrey Judd, a famous radio actor.
Anjli Mohindra as Tara Lohia, an ambitious radio producer.
Susan Penhaligon as Joan
Joshua Oakes-Rogers as Paul

Production
The television film was announced by the channel editor for BBC Four, Cassian Harrison, at the Edinburgh TV Festival on 23 August 2018 alongside other commissions including "The Yorkshire Ripper", "You, Me and Eugenics" and the acquisition of the television series "The Plague".

The film was shot at Maida Vale Studios.

Broadcast
The film was broadcast on 24 December 2018 and was viewed by 0.991 million viewers.

References

External links
 
 

Works by Mark Gatiss
Ghosts in television
Maida Vale
2010s English-language films
2018 television films
BBC television dramas
British horror television films
2018 films
2018 drama films
A Ghost Story for Christmas
2010s British films